Michael Joseph Venezia (May 5, 1945 – October 13, 1988) was an American Thoroughbred horse racing jockey who was killed in a horse racing accident.

Early life
Venezia was born on May 5, 1945, in Brooklyn, New York City.

Career
Venezia had been a jockey for twenty-five years and rode his first winner in 1964. He had ridden 2,313 winners when he was thrown from his horse, Mr. Walter K. and trampled to death by a trailing horse during a race at Belmont Park. The New York Times reported he had recently said that the highlight of his career came on December 7, 1964, when he won six races in one day at Aqueduct Racetrack.

Venezia was actually named Frederick Venezia (by tradition, after his paternal grandfather) when he was born. But his uncle, Michael Venezia, a Sergeant in the United States Army was killed in action while fighting in Germany on April 18, 1945, so when the telegram announcing the tragic event arrived just after the birth, the name was changed to Michael in honor of the fallen uncle.

Death
Venezia was killed in a horse racing accident on October 13, 1988. He was survived by his wife, Helene, son, Michael Edward, and daughter, Alison.

Legacy
Annually since 1989, the New York Racing Association provides the Mike Venezia Memorial Award to a rider who exemplifies extraordinary sportsmanship and citizenship. Active in jockey affairs, Venezia served as president of the Jockeys' Guild from 1975 to 1981.

References

 New York Times articles on Mike Venezia

1945 births
1988 deaths
Sportspeople from Brooklyn
American jockeys
Sports deaths in New York (state)
Jockeys who died while racing
Burials at the Cemetery of the Holy Rood